is a Japanese manga series written and illustrated by Yellow Tanabe. It was serialized in Shogakukan's shōnen manga magazine Weekly Shōnen Sunday from October 2003 to April 2011, with its chapters collected in 35 tankōbon volumes. The series is about Yoshimori Sumimura and Tokine Yukimura, heirs to rival families of kekkai (barrier magic) users, who must defend their school from the spirits drawn to the sacred land upon which it is built.

It was adapted as a 52-episode anime television series by Sunrise, which was broadcast between October 2006 and February 2008. Both manga and anime series have been licensed for English release in North America by Viz Media. The anime series was broadcast in the United States on Adult Swim from May 2010 to May 2011.

The Kekkaishi manga had over 17 million copies in circulation as of June 2020. In 2007, the manga won the 52nd Shogakukan Manga Award for the shōnen category.

Plot

According to the legend, five hundred years ago, there was an insignificant lord who possessed a mysterious power that drew  (supernatural creatures) to him. A demon exterminator, Tokimori Hazama, was called upon to protect the lord and his castle. The lord's power stayed on the land even when he had died. Thus, Tokimori founded the Hazama clan, who inherited his techniques, to protect the land for centuries to come.

In the present day, Yoshimori Sumimura and Tokine Yukimura, heirs of the Hazama clan, are the  that protect Karasumori (which is located on the grounds of the school they attend). They are ability users (people who can use supernatural powers) who use a technique called . Kekkai is a form of magical energy barrier which is primarily used to capture and destroy ayakashi that are drawn to this . Any ayakashi that stay on the land become stronger. Yoshimori and Tokine are to guard the land from the intrusion of ayakashi who try to "power-up" there.

Yoshimori and Tokine suffered a lot of hardships in their responsibilities to protect Karasumori. The Shadow Organization itself is an organization of ability users that is governed by a council of twelve, consisting of high level ability users. All the members are not the main inheritors of their clans lands or titles, or are loners who have no place to go, and thus have become a force that controls the course of their country.

Many ayakashi try to become more powerful by using Karusumori’s power, including Kokuboro (a group of ayakashi attempting to restore their leaders power), corrupt members of Urakai’s council of twelve who either were in league with Kokuboro or trying to kill another council member. Eventually a civil war begins between the leader and founder of Urakai, the leader (a powerful psychic who became a puppet of the founder) and the founder (another powerful psychic who alone with his power create Urakai, an army/intelligence agency at his disposal) who have become disembodied creatures who can possess others to act as their bodies to fool the other members into thinking the leadership of Urakai has changed hands.

Over the course of the story it is revealed little by little that the legend is full of lies. Tokimori used forbidden arts to try to give his son unearthly power, but the plan backfired, and instead gave Chūshinmaru the power to draw people's life force, killing everybody around him. Tokimori was forced to seal his own son beneath Karasumori. However, being alone with no aid Tokimori was unable to completely seal off the Shinkai he created, which allowed Chūshinmaru's power to leak out, and it is this that draws ayakashi to the land.

In the end, with the help of Yoshimori's mother and Tokimori, Yoshimori and Tokine find a new site for Chūshinmaru by displacing the founder of the Urakai from the domain of a land-god that the founder had taken over. To seal Chūshinmaru, Yoshimori's mother sacrifices herself by sealing the domain with herself inside. The series end with Urakai finally becoming better for all and the two families duties are finally finished ending their personal rivalry, with Yoshimori finally feeling everything was right with the world.

Production
Yellow Tanabe says that she uses reference books with pictures as inspiration for designs of ayakashi. She used her own images of the appearances of kanji characters of special terms and placed the terms in a system in order to create the special powers of the Kekkaishi and the terms of magic in the series. In regards to what inspired her to create the Shadow Organization, she said "I'm not really sure. I just sort of thought that's the way organizations are."

Media

Manga

Written and illustrated by Yellow Tanabe, a prototype of Kekkaishi was first published in Shogakukan's shōnen manga magazine Weekly Shōnen Sunday on April 23, 2003 (later posted online in 2009). It was serialized in the same magazine from October 22, 2003, to April 6, 2011, finishing with 345 chapters. Shogakukan collected its chapters in thirty-five tankōbon volumes, released from February 18, 2004, to August 18, 2011. Shogakukan re-released the series in an eighteen-volume kanzenban edition, published from June 18, 2020, to February 18, 2021.

The series is licensed for English release in North America by Viz Media. Viz Media released the 35 volumes of Kekkaishi from May 3, 2005 to December 11, 2012.

It is also licensed in France by Pika Édition, in Germany by Carlsen Comics, in Hong Kong by Rightman Publishing Limited, in Indonesia by Elex Media Komputindo which serializes it in Shōnen Star, in Italy by Panini Comics, in Malaysia by PCM Comics, in South Korea by Bookbox, in Spain by Editorial Ivrea, in Taiwan by Tong Li Comics, in Vietnam by Kim Dong and in Brazil by Panini Comics.

A guidebook to the series, titled , was published by Shogakukan, under the Shōnen Sunday Comics Special imprint on December 16, 2006.

Anime

Kekkaishi was adapted by Sunrise as an anime television series directed by Kenji Kodama with character designs by Hirotoshi Takaya and music by Taku Iwasaki. The series was broadcast for 52 episodes in Japan between October 16, 2006 and February 12, 2008 on Nippon TV, Yomiuri TV, and other Nippon Television Network System stations.

The anime was licensed in North America by Viz Media. which began broadcasting episodes online through Hulu.com in January 2010. The series premiered on TV on May 29, 2010 on Cartoon Network's block Adult Swim. Discotek Media re-licensed the series after Viz Media lost the rights. It was only confirmed for streaming, but a home video release was hinted at a later date. Crunchyroll added the series to its catalog in May 2021.

Video games
A Wii game  was released on September 27, 2007 in Japan.

Reception

The manga had over 15 million copies in circulation as of April 2011. The manga had 17 million copies in circulation as of June 2020. Volumes 19, 20, and 21 all reached number 3 or 4 on the Tohan best-seller list.

In 2007, Kekkaishi received the Shogakukan Manga Award for best shōnen manga. The English edition of Kekkaishi was named by the Young Adult Library Services Association as among the best graphic novels for teens for 2007.

During its initial broadcast, episodes of the anime series were frequently among the top ten rated anime television shows, sometimes as the only original (non-sequel) show to do so.

Notes

References

External links

Shōnen Sunday official manga website 
Sunrise official anime website 
Yomiuri TV official anime site 

2003 manga
2006 anime television series debuts
Adventure anime and manga
Discotek Media
Exorcism in anime and manga
Romance anime and manga
Shogakukan manga
Shōnen manga
Sunrise (company)
Supernatural anime and manga
Viz Media anime
Viz Media manga
Winners of the Shogakukan Manga Award for shōnen manga
Yomiuri Telecasting Corporation original programming